Dr. Pricilla Nanyang (Priscila Nyanyang or Priscilla Nyayang Joseph Kuch) is a South Sudanese politician. She has served as deputy minister for gender, child and social welfare as well as minister without portfolio.

Education 
Nanyang earned a Bachelors of Medicine and Surgery in 1978 from University of Khartoum.

Career 
Between 2005 and 2010 she served as a Sudan People's Liberation Movement (SPLM) member of National Assembly and Chairperson of the Human Rights Committee in the National Parliament. In 2007, Nanyang participated in an SPLM task force to try and facilitate peace talks in Darfur. Nanyang was one of seven women appointed to the South Sudanese cabinet in June 2010. She was appointed  Minister Without Portfolio in the Cabinet of South Sudan on 10 July 2011. As Minister Without Portfolio, Nanyang led an eight-week research project, called "Comprehensive Evaluation of the Government of South Sudan", to study how the South Sudanese Government was performing since its formation in 2005.

She is also the former deputy minister for gender, child and social welfare. In 2014 she coordinated a meeting of women peace activists in Juba "to advance the cause of peace, healing and reconciliation." As deputy minister, she traveled to New York City in 2013 for the 57th Seession of the Commission on the Status of Women and while in New York met with the Program on Peace-building and Rights at Columbia University’s Institute for the Study of Human Rights. As of 2015 Nanyang also held the title of chairperson of the South Sudan Women Peace Network.

See also
 Agnes Kwaje Lasuba
 SPLM
 SPLA
 Cabinet of South Sudan

External links
Website of Government of South Sudan

References

Year of birth missing (living people)
Living people
Government ministers of South Sudan
21st-century South Sudanese women politicians
21st-century South Sudanese politicians
Women government ministers of South Sudan